Tayloe Rogers House is a historic home located in Roanoke, Virginia.  It was built in 1936–1937 and is a -story, rustic Colonial Revival style dwelling.  The main section is flanked by one-story wings. It has a gable roof and features large exterior end chimneys. The house is built of re-used materials from an earlier building on the property that had collapsed as well as other older structures in the area.  Also on the property is a contributing springhouse.

It was listed on the National Register of Historic Places in 2012.

References

Houses on the National Register of Historic Places in Virginia
Colonial Revival architecture in Virginia
Houses completed in 1937
Houses in Roanoke, Virginia
National Register of Historic Places in Roanoke, Virginia